HomeInsurance.com is a national online home insurance marketplace. Customers can compare auto and/or homeowners insurance quotes from up to 10 providers to bundle their home and auto policies. The company, now a part of Red Ventures Insurance, is led by Abhishek 'AJ' Ratani.

The HomeInsurance.com comparison shopping services offer quotes from providers that include MetLife, Safeco Insurance, Liberty Mutual, The Hartford, Travelers, Progressive, ASI/ Ark Royal, American Modern, DRIVE Insurance, and Foremost.

History

HomeInsurance.com's history can be traced back to 1992, when CEO Carlos Lagomarsino opened an insurance agency in Wilmington, NC. Within a few years, he decided to take his business nationwide, launching MyStateInsurance.com in 2001.

In 2007, he purchased the HomeInsurance.com web domain and quickly became one of the first resources to enable insurance comparison shopping, online and off.

In 2010, the company purchase HomeownersInsurance.com to build out its footprint, and in 2011 it was ranked 61st on the Inc. 500 list of fastest-growing U.S. companies.

In March 2012, Red Ventures, a marketing and sales company, acquired HomeInsurance.com, while keeping the company headquarters in Wilmington. The business will relocate to Red Ventures' main office near Charlotte, North Carolina in summer 2015.

References

External links

Financial services companies established in 2007
Online insurance companies
Companies based in Wilmington, North Carolina
Insurance companies of the United States